The Portsmouth Naval Shipyard, often called the Portsmouth Navy Yard, is a United States Navy shipyard in Kittery on the southern boundary of Maine near the city of Portsmouth, New Hampshire. 

Founded in 1800, PNS is U.S. Navy's oldest continuously operating shipyard. Today, most of its work concerns the overhaul, repair, and modernization of submarines. 

As of November 2021, the shipyard employed more than 6,500 federal employees. As well, some of the work is performed by private corporations (e.g., Delphinius Engineering of Eddystone, Pennsylvania; Oceaneering International of Chesapeake, Virginia; Orbis Sibro of Mount Pleasant, South Carolina; and Q.E.D. Systems Inc. of Virginia Beach, Virginia).

History

The Portsmouth Naval Shipyard was established on June 12, 1800, during the administration of President John Adams. It sits on a cluster of conjoined islands called Seavey's Island in the Piscataqua River, whose swift tidal current prevents ice from blocking navigation to the Atlantic Ocean.

The area has a long tradition of shipbuilding. Since colonial settlement, New Hampshire and Maine forests provided lumber for wooden boat construction. , considered the first British warship built in the Thirteen Colonies, was commissioned here in 1696. The Royal Navy reserved the tallest and straightest eastern white pine trees for masts, emblazening the bark with a crown symbol. Raleigh has been depicted on the Seal of New Hampshire since 1784, even though she was captured and served in the British Navy. Other warships followed, including  launched in 1777; Commanded by Captain John Paul Jones, it became the first U. S. Navy vessel to receive an official salute at sea from a foreign power. The 36-gun frigate , one of the first six frigates of the United States Navy, was built at the shipyard from 1795 to 1799.

In the 1790s,  Navy Secretary Benjamin Stoddert decided to build the first federal shipyard. He put it where a proven workforce had access to abundant raw materials: Fernald's Island, for which the government paid $5,500. To protect the new installation, old Fort William and Mary at the mouth of Portsmouth Harbor was rebuilt and renamed Fort Constitution.

Commodore Isaac Hull was the first naval officer to command the Portsmouth Naval Shipyard; he led it from 1800 until 1802, and again in 1812 during the War of 1812. The yard's first product was the 74-gun ship of the line , supervised by local master shipbuilder William Badger and launched in 1814. Barracks were built in 1820, with Marine barracks added in 1827. A hospital was established in 1834. Architect Alexander Parris was appointed chief engineer for the base. It carried 130 tons of slate on a gambrel roof. It was lengthened in 1854 to accommodate  (from which it took its name); the largest wooden warship built at the yard, it required a decade to finish. The structure was considered one of the largest shiphouses in the country until it burned at 5 a.m. on March 10, 1936. On November 2, 1842, Commodore John Drake Sloat responded to a request by Navy  Secretary Abel P. Upshur for information about wages and working hours at the shipyard. Sloat said the "time of work is from sunrise until sunset, except when the sun rises before 7 o'clock or sets after 6 when they commence work at 7 and quit at 6 o clock, not exceeding 10 hours labor at any season of the year." He added that wages "are always fluctuating according to the demand for mechanics".  

Prisoners of war from the Spanish–American War were encamped in 1898 on the grounds of the base. In 1905, construction began on the Portsmouth Naval Prison, a military prison dubbed "The Castle" because of its resemblance to a crenellated castle. It was the principal prison for the Navy and Marine Corps, as well as housing for many German U-boat crews after capture, until it closed in 1974. Also in 1905, the Portsmouth Navy Yard hosted the Treaty of Portsmouth which ended the Russo-Japanese War. For arranging the peace conference, President Theodore Roosevelt won the 1906 Nobel Peace Prize. Delegates met in the General Stores Building, now the Administration Building (called Building 86). In 2005, a summer-long series of events marked the 100th anniversary of the signing of the treaty, including a visit by a Navy destroyer, a parade, and a re-enactment of the arrival of diplomats from the two nations.

During World War I, the shipyard began constructing submarines, with  being the first ever built by a U. S. navy yard. Meanwhile, the base continued to overhaul and repair surface vessels. Consequently, the workforce grew to nearly 5,000 civilians. It grew to almost 25,000 civilians in World War II when over 70 submarines were constructed at the yard, with a record of 4 launched in a single day. When the war ended, the shipyard became the Navy's center for submarine design and development. In 1953,  revolutionized submarine design around the world with its teardrop hull and round cross-section. It is now a museum and tourist attraction in Portsmouth. , the first nuclear-powered submarine built at the base, was launched in 1957. Today the shipyard provides overhaul, refueling, and modernization work.

In the early years of submarine construction, the wood from lignum vitae tree logs was used for propeller shaft bearings. A small pond at Portsmouth, near the Naval Prison, was used to keep the lignum vitae logs submerged in water in order to prevent the wood from cracking.

In 1994, the shipyard was placed on the EPA's National Priorities List (NPL) for environmental investigations/restorations under CERCLA (Superfund). The 2005 Base Realignment and Closure Commission placed the yard on a list for base closures, effective by 2008. Employees organized the Save Our Shipyard campaign to influence the committee to reverse its decision. On 24 August 2005, the base was taken off the list and continues operating under its motto, "From Sails to Atoms."

The shipyard earned the Meritorious Unit Commendation in 2005. The MUC recognized the shipyard for meritorious service from September 11, 2001, to August 30, 2004. Portsmouth Naval Shipyard accomplishments achieved during that period included completion of six major submarine availabilities early, exceeding Net Operation Results financial goals, reducing injuries by more than 50 percent, and exceeding the Secretary of Defense's Fiscal Year 2006 Stretch Goal for lost workday compensation rates two years early.

In addition to the Navy presence, the United States Army New England Recruiting Battalion moved to PNSY in June 2010 from the closed Brunswick Naval Air Station.

PNS is undergoing substantial construction and infrastructure upgrades. In fiscal 2020, Navy contracts were issued to renovate the communications building, build a super flood basin and extend crane rails in Dry Dock 1, upgrade crane rails in Dry Dock 2, renovate Building 2, and implement sundry waterfront projects.

The summer of 2021 saw an uptick in construction contracts issued for Portsmouth Naval Shipyard, including purchase and installation of three 12,000-gallon-per-minute dewatering pumps for the Dry Dock 1 extension, ongoing construction of the Dry Dock 2 complex, commencement of construction on the Virginia-class submarine waterfront support facility (Building 178), and a $1.73 billion contract for building a dry dock for maintenance and upgrade of Virginia-class submarines.

Boundary dispute

New Hampshire laid claim to the Portsmouth Naval Shipyard until the U.S. Supreme Court dismissed the case in 2001, asserting judicial estoppel. Had it been found to belong to New Hampshire, base employees (and their spouses regardless of whether they themselves worked in Maine) from that state would no longer be required to pay Maine income tax. Despite the court's ruling, New Hampshire's 2006 Session House Joint Resolution 1 reaffirmed its sovereignty assertion over Seavey's Island and the base.

Safety concerns 
A CDC / NIOSH study released in 2005 examined the cases of 115 employees at the shipyard who had died of leukemia between 1952 and 1992. The results suggested that leukemia mortality risk increased with increasing cumulative occupational ionizing radiation dose among PNS workers.

Dry docks and slipways

Notable ships built at shipyard predecessors
Piscataqua River region
 1690 — HMS Falkland - (50-gun fourth-rate)
 1696 — HMS Bedford Galley - (32-gun fifth-rate)
 1749 — HMS America - (60-gun fourth-rate)

Badger's Island
 1776 —  - (32-gun frigate)
 1777 —  - (18-gun sloop-of-war)
 1782 —  - (74-gun ship of the line)
 1791 —  - (revenue cutter)
 1797 —  - (36-gun frigate)
 1798 —  - (24-gun sloop-of-war)
 1799 —  - (38-gun frigate)

Notable ships built at the Portsmouth Naval Shipyard

 1814 —  - (74-gun ship of the line)
 1820 —  - (11-gun schooner)
 1828 —  - (24-gun sloop-of-war)
 1839 —  - (20-gun sloop-of-war)
 1841 —  - (50-gun frigate)
 1842 —  - (24-gun sloop-of-war)
 1843 —  - (24-gun sloop-of-war)
 1848 —  - (steam sloop)
 1855 —  - (44-gun frigate)
 1855 — LV-1 - Lightship Nantucket
 1859 —  - (steam sloop)
 1861 —  - (steam sloop)
 1861 —  - (steam sloop)
 1861 —  - (side-wheel steam gunboat)
 1861 —  - (side-wheel steam gunboat)
 1862 —  - (side-wheel steam gunboat)
 1862 —  - (side-wheel steam gunboat)
 1862 —  - (side-wheel steam gunboat)
 1862 —  - (steam sloop)
 1863 —  - (steam gunboat)
 1863 —  - (steam gunboat)
 1863 —  - (Miantonomoh-class monitor)
 1864 —  - (74-gun ship of the line)
 1864 —  - (steam sloop)
 1864 —  - (steam frigate)
 1864 —  - (side-wheel steam gunboat)
 1864 —  - (tugboat)
 1864 —  - (tugboat)
 1865 —  - (steam gunboat)
 1866 —  - (steam frigate)
 1867 —  - (steam frigate)
 1868 —  - (steam sloop)
 1874 —  - (steam sloop)

 1905 —  - (training brigantine)
 1908 —  - (tugboat)
 1917 —  - (United States L-class submarine)
 1918 —  - (United States O-class submarine)
 1918 —  - (United States S-class submarine)
 1919 —  - (United States S-class submarine)
 1919 —  - (United States S-class submarine)
 1919 —  - (United States S-class submarine)
 1920 —  - (United States S-class submarine)
 1920 —  - (United States S-class submarine)
 1920 —  - (United States S-class submarine)
 1920 —  - (United States S-class submarine)
 1921 —  - (United States S-class submarine)
 1921 —  - (United States S-class submarine)
 1921 —  - (United States S-class submarine)
 1924 —  - (diesel submarine)
 1924 —  - (diesel submarine)
 1924 —  - (diesel submarine)
 1928 —  - (diesel submarine minelayer) 3 World War II Pacific patrols
 1929 —  - (diesel submarine cruiser) sank 6 ships in 15 World War II Pacific patrols
 1932 —  - (diesel submarine) 3 World War II Pacific patrols
 1933 —  - (diesel submarine) 3 World War II Pacific patrols 
 1934 —  - (USCG Calumet-class harbor tug)
 4 of 10 s  
 1935 —  - sank 2 ships in 6 World War II Pacific patrols
 1935 —  - sank 1 ship in 8 World War II Pacific patrols
 1936 —  - sank 13 ships in 12 World War II Pacific patrols
 1936 —  - sank 11 ships in 11 World War II Pacific patrols
 2 of 6 s
 1937 —  - sank 4 ships in 11 World War II Pacific patrols
 1937 —  - sank 2 ships in 16 World War II Pacific patrols
 4 of 10 s  
 1938 —  -  sank 3 ships in 9 World War II Pacific patrols
 1939 —  - sank 7 ships in 12 World War II Pacific patrols
 1939 —  - sank 3 ships in 13 World War II Pacific patrols
 1939 —  - sank 18 ships in 15 World War II Pacific patrols
 4 of 12 s  
 1940 —  - sank 11 ships in 6 World War II Pacific patrols
 1940 —  - sank 12 ships in 11 World War II Pacific patrols
 1940 —  - sank 2 ships in 8 World War II Pacific patrols
 1940 —  - sank 1 ship in 6 World War II Pacific patrols
 1 of 2 s 
 1941 — 
 14 of 77 s  
 1941 —  - sank 12 ships in 13 World War II Pacific patrols
 1941 —  - sank 15 ships in 12 World War II Pacific patrols
 1941 —  - sank 11 ships in 12 World War II Pacific patrols
 1941 —  - sank 8 ships in 13 World War II Pacific patrols
 1941 —  - sank 12 ships in 10 World War II Pacific patrols
 1942 —  - sank 6 ships in 5 Atlantic and 3 Pacific World War II patrols
 1942 —  - sank 14 ships in 12 World War II Pacific patrols
 1942 —  - sank 3 ships in 11 World War II Pacific patrols
 1942 —  - 3 World War II Pacific patrols
 1942 —  - sank 6 ships in 10 World War II Pacific patrols
 1942 —  - sank 5 ships in 8 World War II Pacific patrols
 1942 —  - sank 4 ships in 4 World War II Pacific patrols
 1942 —  - sank 17 ships in 9 World War II Pacific patrols
 1942 —  - sank 4 ships in 7 World War II Pacific patrols

 42 of 120 s   
 1942 —  - sank 6 ships in 10 World War II Pacific patrols
 1942 —  - sank 3 ships in 8 World War II Pacific patrols
 1942 —  - sank 16 ships in 9 World War II Pacific patrols
 1942 —  - sank 7 ships in 8 World War II Pacific patrols
 1942 —  - sank 1 ship in 1 World War II Pacific patrol
 1942 —  - 1 World War II Pacific patrol
 1943 —  - sank 8 ships in 7 World War II Pacific patrols
 1943 —  - sank 3 ships in 8 World War II Pacific patrols
 1943 —  - sank 6 ships in 7 World War II Pacific patrols
 1943 —  - sank 6 ships in 7 World War II Pacific patrols

 1943 —  - sank 2 ships in 7 World War II Pacific patrols
 1943 —  - sank 1 ship in 6 World War II Pacific patrols
 1943 —  - sank 10 ships in 5 World War II Pacific patrols
 1943 —  - sank 13 ships in 6 World War II Pacific patrols
 1943 —  - sank 5 ships in 6 World War II Pacific patrols
 1943 —  - sank 8 ships in 6 World War II Pacific patrols
 1943 —  - sank 8 ships in 6 World War II Pacific patrols
 1943 —  - 6 World War II Pacific patrols
 1943 —  - sank 8 ships in 6 World War II Pacific patrols
 1943 —  - sank 2 ships in 6 World War II Pacific patrols
 1943 —  - sank 2 ships in 5 World War II Pacific patrols
 1943 —  - sank 4 ships in 6 World War II Pacific patrols
 1943 —  - sank 4 ships in 6 World War II Pacific patrols
 1943 —  - sank 4 ships in 5 World War II Pacific patrols
 1943 —  - sank 8 ships in 5 World War II Pacific patrols
 1944 —  - 5 World War II Pacific patrols
 1944 —  - sank 5 ships in 2 World War II Pacific patrols
 1944 —  - sank 2 ships in 5 World War II Pacific patrols
 1944 —  - 5 World War II Pacific patrols
 1944 —  - sank 2 ships in 5 World War II Pacific patrols
 1944 —  - 2 World War II Pacific patrols
 1944 —  - sank 5 ships in 5 World War II Pacific patrols
 1944 —  - sank 9 ships in 4 World War II Pacific patrols
 1944 —  - Alden 1964 p. 93</ref> 4 World War II Pacific patrols
 1944 —  - sank 6 ships in 4 World War II Pacific patrols
 1944 —  - sank 1 ship in 4 World War II Pacific patrols
 1944 —  - sank 2 ships in 3 World War II Pacific patrols
 1944 —  - 4 World War II Pacific patrols
 1944 —  - sank 6 ships in 3 World War II Pacific patrols
 1944 —  - sank 7 ships in 4 World War II Pacific patrols
 1944 —  - 3 World War II Pacific patrols
 1944 —  - sank 3 ships in 3 World War II Pacific patrols
 24 of 29 s  
 1944 —  - sank 4 ships in 3 World War II Pacific patrols
 1944 —  - 1 World War II Pacific patrol
 1944 —  - 2 World War II Pacific patrols
 1944 —  - sank 8 ships in 2 World War II Pacific patrols
 1944 —  - 2 World War II Pacific patrols
 1944 —  - 2 World War II Pacific patrols
 1944 —  - sank 3 ships in 2 World War II Pacific patrols
 1944 —  - 1 World War II Pacific patrol
 1944 —  - sank 1 ship in 1 World War II Pacific patrol
 1944 —  - sank 1 ship in 2 World War II Pacific patrols
 1944 — 
 1944 —  - 1 World War II Pacific patrol
 1944 —  - 1 World War II Pacific patrol
 1944 — 
 1945 — 
 1945 — 
 1945 — 
 1945 — 
 1945 — 
 1945 — 
 1945 — 
 1945 — 
 1945 — 
 1945 — 
 1951 —  - (diesel submarine)
 1951 —  - (diesel submarine)

 1951 —  - (diesel submarine)
 1953 —  - (experimental diesel submarine)
 1955 —  - (RADAR picket submarine)
 1956 —  - (RADAR picket submarine)
 1958 —  - (guided missile diesel submarine)
 1958 —  - (nuclear submarine)
 1958 —  - (fast diesel submarine)
 1958 —  - (nuclear submarine)
 1960 —  - (nuclear fast attack submarine)
 1960 —  - (nuclear ballistic missile submarine)
 1963 —  - (nuclear fast attack submarine)
 1961 —  - (nuclear fast attack submarine)
 1963 —  - (nuclear ballistic missile submarine)
 1964 —  - (nuclear ballistic missile submarine)
 1967 —  - (nuclear fast attack submarine)
 1968 —  - (experimental diesel submarine)
 1969 —  - (nuclear fast attack submarine)

See also
 National Register of Historic Places listings in York County, Maine

References

 Portsmouth Naval Shipyard Museum & Research Library (Building 31)

External links

 Naval Shipyard official website
 USS Albacore Museum

United States Navy shipyards
Military installations in Maine
Military Superfund sites
History of Maine
History of New Hampshire
Buildings and structures in Kittery, Maine
Superfund sites in Maine
Historic districts on the National Register of Historic Places in Maine
1800 establishments in the United States
National Register of Historic Places in York County, Maine
Shipyards on the National Register of Historic Places
Shipyards building World War II warships